Medial section may refer to:

 The golden ratio
 Structures close to the centre of an organism, see: anatomical terms of location#Medial and lateral